Edmund Ford (died 1440), of Swainswick, Somerset, was an English politician.

He was a Member (MP) of the Parliament of England for Bath in February 1388.

References

14th-century births
1440 deaths
English MPs February 1388
Politicians from Somerset